Nadine Hofstetter (born 21 October 1994) is a Swiss ice hockey player and member of the Swiss national ice hockey team, currently playing in the Women's League (SWHL A) with the SC Reinach Damen.

Hofstetter represented Switzerland at the 2021 IIHF Women's World Championship. As a junior player with the Swiss national under-18 team, she participated in the IIHF Women's U18 World Championships in 2010 (at the Division I level), 2011, and 2012.

References

External links
 

Living people
1994 births
People from Entlebuch District
Swiss women's ice hockey defencemen
Sportspeople from the canton of Lucerne